The Premier League (legal name: The Football Association Premier League Limited) is the highest level of the men's English football league system. Contested by 20 clubs, it operates on a system of promotion and relegation with the English Football League (EFL). Seasons typically run from August to May with each team playing 38 matches (playing all other teams both home and away). Most games are played on Saturday and Sunday afternoons, with occasional weekday evening fixtures.

The competition was founded as the FA Premier League on 20 February 1992 following the decision of clubs in the Football League First Division to break away from the Football League founded in 1888; however, teams may still be relegated into and promoted from the EFL Championship. The Premier League takes advantage of a lucrative television rights sale to Sky: from 2019 to 2020, the league's accumulated television rights deals were worth around £3.1 billion a year, with Sky and BT Group securing the domestic rights to broadcast 128 and 32 games respectively. The Premier League is a corporation where chief executive Richard Masters is responsible for its management, whilst the member clubs act as shareholders. Clubs were apportioned central payment revenues of £2.4 billion in 2016–17, with a further £343 million in solidarity payments to English Football League (EFL) clubs.

The Premier League is the most-watched sports league in the world, broadcast in 212 territories to 643 million homes and a potential TV audience of 4.7 billion people. For the 2018–19 season, the average Premier League match attendance was at 38,181, second to the German Bundesliga's 43,500, while aggregated attendance across all matches is the highest of any association football league at 14,508,981. Most stadium occupancies are near capacity. The Premier League ranks first in the UEFA coefficients of leagues based on performances in European competitions over the past five seasons as of 2021. The English top-flight has produced the second-highest number of UEFA Champions League/European Cup titles, with five English clubs having won fourteen European trophies in total.

Fifty clubs have competed since the inception of the Premier League in 1992: forty-eight English and two Welsh clubs. Seven of them have won the title: Manchester United (13), Manchester City (6), Chelsea (5), Arsenal (3), Blackburn Rovers (1), Leicester City (1) and Liverpool (1).

History

Origins
Despite significant European success in the 1970s and early 1980s, the late 1980s marked a low point for English football. Stadiums were deteriorating and supporters endured poor facilities, hooliganism was rife, and English clubs had been banned from European competition for five years following the Heysel Stadium disaster in 1985. The Football League First Division, the top level of English football since 1888, was behind leagues such as Italy's Serie A and Spain's La Liga in attendances and revenues, and several top English players had moved abroad.

By the turn of the 1990s, the downward trend was starting to reverse. At the 1990 FIFA World Cup, England reached the semi-finals; UEFA, European football's governing body, lifted the five-year ban on English clubs playing in European competitions in 1990, resulting in Manchester United lifting the UEFA Cup Winners' Cup in 1991. The Taylor Report on stadium safety standards, which proposed expensive upgrades to create all-seater stadiums in the aftermath of the Hillsborough disaster, was published in January 1990.

During the 1980s, major English clubs had begun to transform into business ventures, applying commercial principles to club administration to maximise revenue. Martin Edwards of Manchester United, Irving Scholar of Tottenham Hotspur, and David Dein of Arsenal were among the leaders in this transformation. The commercial imperative led to the top clubs seeking to increase their power and revenue: the clubs in Division One threatened to break away from the Football League, and in so doing they managed to increase their voting power and gain a more favourable financial arrangement, taking a 50% share of all television and sponsorship income in 1986. They demanded that television companies should pay more for their coverage of football matches, and revenue from television grew in importance. The Football League received £6.3 million for a two-year agreement in 1986, but by 1988, in a deal agreed with ITV, the price rose to £44 million over four years with the leading clubs taking 75% of the cash. According to Scholar, who was involved in the negotiations of television deals, each of the First Division clubs received only around £25,000 per year from television rights before 1986, this increased to around £50,000 in the 1986 negotiation, then to £600,000 in 1988. The 1988 negotiations were conducted under the threat of ten clubs leaving to form a "super league", but they were eventually persuaded to stay, with the top clubs taking the lion's share of the deal. The negotiations also convinced the bigger clubs that in order to receive enough votes, they needed to take the whole of First Division with them instead of a smaller "super league". By the beginning of the 1990s, the big clubs again considered breaking away, especially now that they had to fund the cost of stadium upgrade as proposed by the Taylor Report.

In 1990, the managing director of London Weekend Television (LWT), Greg Dyke, met with the representatives of the "big five" football clubs in England (Manchester United, Liverpool, Tottenham Hotspur, Everton and Arsenal) over a dinner. The meeting was to pave the way for a breakaway from The Football League. Dyke believed that it would be more lucrative for LWT if only the larger clubs in the country were featured on national television and wanted to establish whether the clubs would be interested in a larger share of television rights money. The five clubs agreed with the suggestion and decided to press ahead with it; however, the league would have no credibility without the backing of The Football Association, and so David Dein of Arsenal held talks to see whether the FA were receptive to the idea. The FA did not have an amicable relationship with the Football League at the time and considered it as a way to weaken the Football League's position. The FA released a report in June 1991, Blueprint for the Future of Football, that supported the plan for the Premier League with the FA as the ultimate authority that would oversee the breakaway league.

Foundation (1990s)

At the close of the 1990–1991 season, a proposal was tabled for the establishment of a new league that would bring more money into the game overall. The Founder Members Agreement, signed on 17 July 1991 by the game's top-flight clubs, established the basic principles for setting up the FA Premier League. The newly formed top division was to have commercial independence from The Football Association and the Football League, giving the FA Premier League licence to negotiate its own broadcast and sponsorship agreements. The argument given at the time was that the extra income would allow English clubs to compete with teams across Europe. Although Dyke played a significant role in the creation of the Premier League, he and ITV (of which LWT was part) lost out in the bidding for broadcast rights: BSkyB won with a bid of £304 million over five years, with the BBC awarded the highlights package broadcast on Match of the Day.

The First Division clubs resigned en masse from the Football League in 1992, and on 27 May that year the FA Premier League was formed as a limited company, working out of an office at the Football Association's then headquarters in Lancaster Gate. The 22 inaugural members of the new Premier League were:

Arsenal
Aston Villa
Blackburn Rovers
Chelsea
Coventry City
Crystal Palace
Everton
Ipswich Town
Leeds United
Liverpool
Manchester City
Manchester United
Middlesbrough
Norwich City
Nottingham Forest
Oldham Athletic
Queens Park Rangers
Sheffield United
Sheffield Wednesday
Southampton
Tottenham Hotspur
Wimbledon

This meant a break-up of the 104-year-old Football League that had operated until then with four divisions; the Premier League would operate with a single division and the Football League with three. There was no change in competition format; the same number of teams competed in the top flight, and promotion and relegation between the Premier League and the new First Division remained the same as the old First and Second Divisions with three teams relegated from the league and three promoted.

The league held its first season in 1992–93. It was composed of 22 clubs for that season (reduced to 20 in the 1995–96 season). The first Premier League goal was scored by Brian Deane of Sheffield United in a 2–1 win against Manchester United. 
Luton Town, Notts County, and West Ham United were the three teams relegated from the old First Division at the end of the 1991–92 season, and did not take part in the inaugural Premier League season.

Manchester United won the inaugural edition of the new league, ending a twenty-six year wait to be crown champions of England. Bolstered by this breakthrough, United immediately became the competitions dominant team, winning seven of the first nine trophies, two League and FA-Cup 'doubles' and a European treble, initially under a team of hardened veterans such as Bryan Robson, Steve Bruce, Paul Ince, Mark Hughes and Eric Cantona, before Cantona, Bruce and Roy Keane led a young dynamic new team filled with the Class of 92, a group of young players including David Beckham who came through the Manchester United Academy. As the decade closed, United's first persistent Premier League rival, Arsenal F.C. won the League and F.A. Cup double themselves, and the Big 2 would form a duopoly for the next 5 years.

"Top Four" dominance (2000s)

The 2000s saw the rise of first Liverpool, and then Arsenal to real competitiveness, Chelsea finally breaking the duopoly by winning in 2004-05. The dominance of the so-called "Top Four" clubs. Arsenal, Chelsea, Liverpool and Manchester United saw them finish at the top of the table for the bulk of the decade, thereby guaranteeing qualification for the UEFA Champions League. Only three other clubs managed to qualify for the competition during this period: Newcastle United (2001–02 and 2002–03), Everton (2004–05) and Tottenham Hotspur (2009–10) – each occupying the final Champions League spot, with the exception of Newcastle in the 2002–03 season, who finished third.

Following the 2003–04 season, Arsenal acquired the nickname "The Invincibles" as it became the first, and to date, only club to complete a Premier League campaign without losing a single game.

In May 2008, Kevin Keegan stated that "Top Four" dominance threatened the division: "This league is in danger of becoming one of the most boring but great leagues in the world." Premier League chief executive Richard Scudamore said in defence: "There are a lot of different tussles that go on in the Premier League depending on whether you're at the top, in the middle or at the bottom that make it interesting."

Between 2005 and 2012 there was a Premier League representative in seven of the eight Champions League finals, with only "Top Four" clubs reaching that stage. Liverpool (2005), Manchester United (2008) and Chelsea (2012) won the competition during this period, with Arsenal (2006), Liverpool (2007), Chelsea (2008) and Manchester United (2009 and 2011) all losing Champions League finals. Leeds United were the only non-"Top Four" side to reach the semi-finals of the Champions League, in the 2000–01 season. There were three Premier League teams in the Champions League semi-finals in 2006–07, 2007–08, and 2008–09, a feat only ever achieved five times (along with Serie A in 2002–03 and La Liga in 1999–2000).

Additionally, between the 1999–2000 and 2009–10 seasons, four Premier League sides reached UEFA Cup or Europa League finals, with only Liverpool managing to win the competition in 2001. Arsenal (2000), Middlesbrough (2006) and Fulham (2010) all lost their finals.

Although the group's dominance was reduced to a degree after this period with the emergence of Manchester City and Tottenham, in terms of all-time Premier League points won they remain clear by some margin. As of the end of the 2021–22 season – the 27th season of the Premier League – Liverpool, in fourth place in the all-time points table, were over 300 points ahead of the next team, Tottenham Hotspur. They are also the only teams to maintain a winning average of over 50% throughout their entire Premier League tenures.

Emergence of the "Big Six" (2010s)

The years following 2009 marked a shift in the structure of the "Top Four" with Tottenham Hotspur and Manchester City both breaking into the top four places on a regular basis, turning the "Top Four" into the "Big Six". In the 2009–10 season, Tottenham finished fourth and became the first team to break the top four since Everton five years prior. Criticism of the gap between an elite group of "super clubs" and the majority of the Premier League has continued, nevertheless, due to their increasing ability to spend more than the other Premier League clubs. Manchester City won the title in the 2011–12 season, becoming the first club outside the "Big Four" to win since Blackburn Rovers in the 1994–95 season. That season also saw two of the "Big Four" (Chelsea and Liverpool) finish outside the top four places for the first time since that season.

With only four UEFA Champions League qualifying places available in the league, greater competition for qualification now exists, albeit from a narrow base of six clubs. In the five seasons following the 2011–12 campaign, Manchester United and Liverpool both found themselves outside of the top four three times, while Chelsea finished 10th in the 2015–16 season. Arsenal finished 5th in 2016–17, ending their record run of 20 consecutive top-four finishes.

In the 2015–16 season, the top four was breached by a non-Big Six side for the first time since Everton in 2005. Leicester City were the surprise winners of the league, qualifying for the Champions League as a result.

Off the pitch, the "Big Six" wield significant financial power and influence, with these clubs arguing that they should be entitled to a greater share of revenue due to the greater stature of their clubs globally and the attractive football they aim to play. Objectors argue that the egalitarian revenue structure in the Premier League helps to maintain a competitive league which is vital for its future success. The 2016–17 Deloitte Football Money League report showed the financial disparity between the "Big Six" and the rest of the division. All of the "Big Six" had revenues greater than €350 million, with Manchester United having the largest revenue in the league at €676.3 million. Leicester City was the closest club to the "Big Six" in terms of revenue, recording a figure of €271.1 million for that season – helped by participation in the Champions League. The eighth-largest revenue generator, West Ham – who did not play in European competition – had revenues of €213.3 million, less than half of those of the club with the fifth-largest revenue, Liverpool (€424.2 million). A substantial part of the clubs' revenue by then came from television broadcast deals, with the biggest clubs each taking from around £150 million to nearly £200 million in the 2016–17 season from such deals. In Deloitte's 2019 report, all the "Big Six" were in the top ten of the world's richest clubs.

2020s

From the 2019–20 season, video assistant referees were used in the league.

Project Big Picture was announced in October 2020 that described a plan to reunite the top Premier League clubs with the English Football League, proposed by leading Premier League clubs Manchester United and Liverpool. It has been criticised by the Premier League leadership and the UK government's Department of Culture, Media and Sport.

On 26 April 2021, play was stopped during a match between Leicester City and Crystal Palace to allow players Wesley Fofana and Cheikhou Kouyaté to break Ramadan fast. It is believed to be the first time in Premier League history that a game was paused to allow Muslim players to eat and drink after the sun had set in accordance with the rules of the faith.

The 2022–23 season will be the first to take a six-week break between November and December 2022 to allow for the first winter World Cup, with a return for the Boxing Day fixtures. The Premier League players decided to take the knee only at some selected "significant moments", instead of the routine before matches. However, they assured to "remain resolutely committed to eradicate racial prejudice".

In February 2023, the Premier League concluded its four years of investigation into Manchester City, and alleged the club sitting second in its table of breaching the league’s financial rules from 2009-18. City was alleged of more than 100 violations during the first nine years under Abu Dhabi owners, Mansour bin Zayed and Khaldoon Al Mubarak. The charges included 80 alleged breaches of financial rules between 2009-18, and over 30 alleged violations concerning the failure to co-operate with Premier League’s investigation, which was opened in December 2018. The league’s allegations were referred to an independent commission, while the penalties that the club could face were unclear.

Corporate structure
The Football Association Premier League Ltd (FAPL) is operated as a corporation and is owned by the 20 member clubs. Each club is a shareholder, with one vote each on issues such as rule changes and contracts. The clubs elect a chairman, chief executive, and board of directors to oversee the daily operations of the league. The Football Association is not directly involved in the day-to-day operations of the Premier League, but has veto power as a special shareholder during the election of the chairman and chief executive and when new rules are adopted by the league.

The current chief executive is Richard Masters, who was appointed in December 2019. The chair is due to be Alison Brittain, who will take over the role in early 2023.

The Premier League sends representatives to UEFA's European Club Association, the number of clubs and the clubs themselves chosen according to UEFA coefficients. For the 2012–13 season the Premier League has 10 representatives in the Association: Arsenal, Aston Villa, Chelsea, Everton, Fulham, Liverpool, Manchester City, Manchester United, Newcastle United and Tottenham Hotspur. The European Club Association is responsible for electing three members to UEFA's Club Competitions Committee, which is involved in the operations of UEFA competitions such as the Champions League and UEFA Europa League.

Criticism of governance 
The Premier League has faced criticism of its governance due to an alleged lack of transparency and accountability.

Following the Premier League's blocking of the attempted takeover of Newcastle United by a PIF-backed consortium through the league's Owners' and Directors' test, many MPs, Newcastle United fans and related parties to the deal denounced the Premier League for its perceived lack of transparency and accountability throughout the process. On 6 July 2021, consortium member Amanda Staveley of PCP Capital Partners said that "fans surely deserve absolute transparency from the regulators across all their processes – to best ensure that they act responsibly. They (the Premier League) are performing a function like that of a government regulator – but without the same systems for accountability."

On 22 July 2021, Tracey Crouch MP – chair of the fan-led review into the UK's football governance – announced in the review's interim findings that the Premier League had "lost the trust and confidence" of fans. The review also recommended that a new independent regulator be created to oversee matters such as club takeovers.

Premier League chief executive Richard Masters had earlier spoken out against the implementation of an independent regulator, saying in May 2021, "I don't think that the independent regulator is the answer to the question. I would defend the Premier League's role as regulator of its clubs over the past 30 years."

Competition format

Competition
There are 20 clubs in the Premier League. During the course of a season (from August to May) each club plays the others twice (a double round-robin system), once at their home stadium and once at that of their opponents, for 38 games. Teams receive three points for a win and one point for a draw. No points are awarded for a loss. Teams are ranked by total points, then goal difference, and then goals scored. If still equal, teams are deemed to occupy the same position. If there is a tie for the championship, for relegation, or for qualification to other competitions, the head-to-head record between the tied teams is taken into consideration (points scored in the matches between the teams, followed by away goals in those matches.) If two teams are still tied, a play-off match at a neutral venue decides rank.

Promotion and relegation
A system of promotion and relegation exists between the Premier League and the EFL Championship. The three lowest placed teams in the Premier League are relegated to the Championship, and the top two teams from the Championship promoted to the Premier League, with an additional team promoted after a series of play-offs involving the third, fourth, fifth and sixth placed clubs. The number of clubs was reduced from 22 to 20 in 1995, when four teams were relegated from the league and only two teams promoted. The top flight had only been expanded to 22 teams at the start of the 1991–92 season – the year prior to the formation of the Premier League.

On 8 June 2006, FIFA requested that all major European leagues, including Italy's Serie A and Spain's La Liga, be reduced to 18 teams by the start of the 2007–08 season. The Premier League responded by announcing their intention to resist such a reduction. Ultimately, the 2007–08 season kicked off again with 20 teams.

Video Assistant Referee
Video assistant referee (VAR), was introduced to the Premier League at the beginning of the 2019-20 season. It uses technology and officials to assist the referee in making decisions on the pitch. However, its use has been met with mixed receptions from fans and pundits, with some praising its accuracy while others criticise its impact on the flow of the game and consistency of decision-making.

The on-field referee still makes the final decision, but VAR can assist the referee in the decision-making process. VAR can only be used for four types of decisions: goals, penalty decisions, direct red card incidents, and cases of mistaken identity. VAR officials review the video footage and communicate with the on-field referee via a headset. The VAR officials are located in a central control room, which is equipped with multiple camera angles and the ability to replay footage at various speeds.

A study evaluating fan reception of VAR in the Premier League was made by Otto Kolbinger and Melanie Knopp and was done by analysing Twitter data. The researchers used sentiment analysis to measure the overall positive or negative attitudes towards VAR, as well as topic modelling to identify specific issues that fans are discussing related to VAR. The study found that the reception of VAR on Twitter is largely negative, with fans expressing frustration and criticism of the technology's impact on the flow of the game and the inconsistency of decisions. The researchers also identified specific issues, such as handball and offside decisions, that fans are particularly critical of. The study concludes that VAR has not been well received by fans in the Premier League, and that efforts to improve the technology and increase transparency in decision-making are needed to address these concerns.

Clubs

Fifty clubs have played in the Premier League from its inception in 1992, up to and including the 2022–23 season.

Champions

Notably, one-time champions Blackburn Rovers are the only former champions currently out of the Premier League.

2022–23 season
Twenty clubs will compete in the 2022–23 Premier League, with three promoted from the Championship:

Burnley, Watford, and Norwich City were relegated to the EFL Championship for the 2022–23 season, while Fulham, Bournemouth and Nottingham Forest, as winners, runners-up and play-off final winners, respectively, were promoted from the 2021–22 season.
Only two clubs have remained in the Premier League since their first promotion: Brentford and Brighton & Hove Albion, who have been in 2 and 6 seasons (out of 31), respectively.

Non-English clubs

In 2011, after Swansea City gained promotion, a Welsh club participated in the Premier League for the first time. The first Premier League match to be played outside England was Swansea City's home match at the Liberty Stadium against Wigan Athletic on 20 August 2011. The number of Welsh clubs in the Premier League increased to two in 2013–14, as Cardiff City gained promotion, but they were relegated after their maiden season. Cardiff were promoted again in 2017–18 but the number of Welsh clubs remained the same for the 2018–19 Premier League season, as Swansea City had been relegated from the Premier League in 2017–18. Following Cardiff City's relegation after the 2018–19 season, there are currently no Welsh clubs participating in the Premier League.

Because they are members of the Football Association of Wales (FAW), the question of whether clubs like Swansea should represent England or Wales in European competitions has caused long-running discussions in UEFA. Swansea took one of England's three available places in the Europa League in 2013–14 by winning the League Cup in 2012–13. The right of Welsh clubs to take up such English places was in doubt until UEFA clarified the matter in March 2012, allowing them to participate.

Participation in the Premier League by some Scottish or Irish clubs has sometimes been discussed, but without result. The idea came closest to reality in 1998, when Wimbledon received Premier League approval to relocate to Dublin, Ireland, but the move was blocked by the Football Association of Ireland. Additionally, the media occasionally discusses the idea that Scotland's two biggest teams, Celtic and Rangers, should or will take part in the Premier League, but nothing has come of these discussions.

International competitions

Qualification for European competitions

Qualification criteria for 2020–21

The top four teams in the Premier League qualify automatically for the subsequent season's UEFA Champions League group stage. The winners of the Champions League and UEFA Europa League may earn an additional qualification for the subsequent season's Champions League group stage if they are not in the top four. If this means six Premier League teams qualify, then the fourth-placed team in the Premier League instead plays in the Europa League, as any single nation is limited to a maximum of five teams in the Champions League.

The fifth-placed team in the Premier League, as well as the winner of the FA Cup, qualifies for the subsequent season's Europa League group stage, but if the winner of the FA Cup also finished in the top five places in the Premier League or has won one of UEFA's major tournaments, then this place reverts to the team that finished sixth. The winner of the EFL Cup qualifies for the subsequent season's Europa Conference League, but if the winner already qualified for a UEFA competition via their performance in another competition, then this place reverts to the team that finished sixth in the Premier League, or seventh if the FA Cup result already caused the sixth-placed team to qualify.

The number of places allocated to English clubs in UEFA competitions is dependent upon the position a country holds in the UEFA country coefficients, which are calculated based upon the performance of teams in UEFA competitions in the previous five years. Currently the ranking of England (and de facto the Premier League) is second, behind Spain.

Previous seasons
An exception to the usual European qualification system happened in 2005, after Liverpool won the Champions League the season before, but did not finish in a Champions League qualification place in the Premier League. UEFA gave special dispensation for Liverpool to enter the Champions League, giving England five qualifiers. UEFA subsequently ruled that the defending champions qualify for the competition the following year regardless of their domestic league placing. However, for those leagues with four entrants in the Champions League, this meant that if the Champions League winner finished outside the top four in its domestic league, it would qualify at the expense of the fourth-placed team in the league. At that time, no association could have more than four entrants in the Champions League. This occurred in 2012, when Chelsea – who had won the Champions League that summer, but finished sixth in the league – qualified for the Champions League in place of Tottenham Hotspur, who went into the Europa League.

From 2015–16, the Europa League winners qualify for the Champions League, increasing the maximum number of participants per country to five. This took effect in England in 2016–17, when Manchester United finished sixth in the Premier League and won the Europa League, giving England five Champions League entrants for 2017–18. In these instances, any Europa League berth vacated will not be handed down to the next-best Premier League finisher outside a qualifying place and so the association's Europa League entrants for the following season will be reduced. If it happens that both Champions League and Europa League winners are of the same association and both finish outside the top four, then the fourth-placed team will be transferred to the Europa League.

Performance in international competition

Between the 1992–93 and the 2021–22 seasons, Premier League clubs won the UEFA Champions League six times (and had eight runners-up), behind Spain's La Liga with twelve wins, and ahead of, among others, Italy's Serie A with five wins and Germany's Bundesliga with four wins. The FIFA Club World Cup (originally called the FIFA Club World Championship) has been won three times by a Premier League club (Manchester United in 2008, Liverpool in 2019, and Chelsea in 2021), with two runners-up (Liverpool in 2005 and Chelsea in 2012), behind Spain's La Liga with seven wins and Brazil's Brasileirão with four wins.

Sponsorship

The league changed its name from the FA Premier League to simply the Premier League in 2007. From 1993 to 2016, the Premier League had title sponsorship rights sold to two companies, which were Carling brewery and Barclays Bank PLC; Barclays was the most recent title sponsor, having sponsored the Premier League from 2001 until 2016 (until 2004, the title sponsorship was held through its Barclaycard brand before shifting to its main banking brand in 2004).

Barclays' deal with the Premier League expired at the end of the 2015–16 season. The FA announced on 4 June 2015 that it would not pursue any further title sponsorship deals for the Premier League, arguing that they wanted to build a "clean" brand for the competition more in line with those of major U.S. sports leagues.

As well as sponsorship for the league itself, the Premier League has a number of official partners and suppliers. The official ball supplier for the league is Nike who have had the contract since the 2000–01 season when they took over from Mitre. Under its Merlin brand, Topps held the licence to produce collectables for the Premier League between 1994 and 2019 including stickers (for their sticker album) and trading cards. Launched in the 2007–08 season, Topps’ Match Attax, the official Premier League trading card game, is the best selling boys collectable in the UK, and is also the biggest selling sports trading card game in the world. In October 2018, Panini were awarded the licence to produce collectables from the 2019–20 season. The chocolate company Cadbury has been the official snack partner of the Premier League since 2017, and sponsored the Golden Boot, Golden Glove and Playmaker of the Season awards from the 2017–18 season to 2019–20 season. The Coca-Cola Company (under its Coca-Cola Zero Sugar product line) sponsored these awards during the 2020–21 season with Castrol being the current sponsor as of the 2021–22 season.

Finances

The Premier League has the highest revenue of any association football league in the world, with total club revenues of €2.48 billion in 2009–10. In 2013–14, due to improved television revenues and cost controls, the Premier League clubs collectively made a net profit in excess of £78 million, exceeding all other football leagues. In 2010 the Premier League was awarded the Queen's Award for Enterprise in the International Trade category for its outstanding contribution to international trade and the value it brings to English football and the United Kingdom's broadcasting industry.

The Premier League includes some of the richest football clubs in the world. Deloitte's "Football Money League" listed seven Premier League clubs in the top 20 for the 2009–10 season, and all 20 clubs were in the top 40 globally by the end of the 2013–14 season, largely as a result of increased broadcasting revenue. In 2019, the league generated around £3.1 billion per year in domestic and international television rights.

Premier League clubs agreed in principle in December 2012, to radical new cost controls. The two proposals consist of a break-even rule and a cap on the amount clubs can increase their wage bill by each season. With the new television deals on the horizon, momentum has been growing to find ways of preventing the majority of the cash going straight to players and agents.

Central payments for the 2016–17 season amounted to £2,398,515,773 across the 20 clubs, with each team receiving a flat participation fee of £35,301,989 and additional payments for TV broadcasts (£1,016,690 for general UK rights to match highlights, £1,136,083 for each live UK broadcast of their games and £39,090,596 for all overseas rights), commercial rights (a flat fee of £4,759,404) and a notional measure of "merit" which was based upon final league position. The merit component was a nominal sum of £1,941,609 multiplied by each finishing place, counted from the foot of the table (e.g., Burnley finished 16th in May 2017, five places counting upwards, and received 5 × £1,941,609 = £9,708,045 merit payment).

Relegation

Since its split with the Football League, established clubs in the Premier League have a funding disparity from counterparts in lower leagues. Revenue from television rights between the leagues has played a part in this.

Promoted teams have found it difficult to avoid relegation in their first Premier League season. One Premier League newcomer has been relegated back to the Football League every season, save the 2001–02, 2011–12 and 2017–18 seasons. In the 1997–98 season, all three promoted clubs were relegated by the season's end.

The Premier League distributes a portion of its television revenue as "parachute payments" to relegated clubs for adjustment to television revenue loss. The average Premier League team receives £41 million while the average Championship club receives £2 million. Starting with the 2013–14 season, these payments are in excess of £60 million over four seasons. Critics maintain that the payments widen the gap between teams that have reached the Premier League and those that have not, leading to the common occurrence of teams "bouncing back" soon after their relegation.

Clubs which have failed to win immediate promotion back to the Premier League have seen financial problems, in some cases administration or liquidation. Further relegations down the footballing ladder have occurred for multiple clubs unable to cope with the gap.

Media coverage

United Kingdom and Ireland

Television has played a major role in the history of the Premier League. The League's decision to assign broadcasting rights to Sky in 1992 was at the time a radical decision, but one that has paid off. At the time, paid television was an almost untested proposition in the UK market as was charging fans to watch live televised football. However, a combination of Sky's strategy, the quality of Premier League football and the public's appetite for the game has seen the value of the Premier League's TV rights soar.

The Premier League sells its television rights on a collective basis. This is in contrast to some other European leagues, including La Liga, in which each club sells its rights individually, leading to a much higher share of the total income going to the top few clubs. The money is divided into three parts: half is divided equally between the clubs; one quarter is awarded on a merit basis based on final league position, the top club getting twenty times as much as the bottom club, and equal steps all the way down the table; the final quarter is paid out as facilities fees for games that are shown on television, with the top clubs generally receiving the largest shares of this. The income from overseas rights is divided equally between the twenty clubs.

Not all Premier League matches are televised in the United Kingdom, as the league upholds the long-standing prohibition on telecasts of any association football match (domestic or otherwise) that kicks off between 2:45 p.m. and 5:15 p.m. on Saturday matchdays.

The first Sky television rights agreement was worth £304 million over five seasons. The next contract, negotiated to start from the 1997–98 season, rose to £670 million over four seasons. The third contract was a £1.024 billion deal with BSkyB for the three seasons from 2001 to 2002 to 2003–04. The league brought in £320 million from the sale of its international rights for the three-year period from 2004 to 2005 to 2006–07. It sold the rights itself on a territory-by-territory basis. Sky's monopoly was broken from August 2006 when Setanta Sports was awarded rights to show two out of the six packages of matches available. This occurred following an insistence by the European Commission that exclusive rights should not be sold to one television company. Sky and Setanta paid £1.7 billion, a two-thirds increase which took many commentators by surprise as it had been widely assumed that the value of the rights had levelled off following many years of rapid growth. Setanta also hold rights to a live 3 pm match solely for Irish viewers. The BBC retained the rights to show highlights for the same three seasons (on Match of the Day) for £171.6 million, a 63 per cent increase on the £105 million it paid for the previous three-year period. Sky and BT agreed to jointly pay £84.3 million for delayed television rights to 242 games (that is the right to broadcast them in full on television and over the internet) in most cases for a period of 50 hours after 10 pm on matchday. Overseas television rights fetched £625 million, nearly double the previous contract. The total raised from those deals was more than £2.7 billion, giving Premier League clubs an average media income from league games of around £40 million-a-year from 2007 to 2010.

The TV rights agreement between the Premier League and Sky faced accusations of being a cartel, and a number of court cases arose as a result. An investigation by the Office of Fair Trading in 2002 found BSkyB to be dominant within the pay TV sports market, but concluded that there were insufficient grounds for the claim that BSkyB had abused its dominant position. In July 1999 the Premier League's method of selling rights collectively for all member clubs was investigated by the UK Restrictive Practices Court, which concluded that the agreement was not contrary to the public interest.

The BBC's highlights package on Saturday and Sunday nights, as well as other evenings when fixtures justify, ran until 2016. Television rights alone for the period 2010 to 2013 were purchased for £1.782 billion. On 22 June 2009, due to troubles encountered by Setanta Sports after it failed to meet a final deadline over a £30 million payment to the Premier League, ESPN was awarded two packages of UK rights containing 46 matches that were available for the 2009–10 season as well as a package of 23 matches per season from 2010 to 2011 to 2012–13. On 13 June 2012, the Premier League announced that BT had been awarded 38 games a season for the 2013–14, 2014–15 and 2015–16 seasons at £246 million-a-year. The remaining 116 games were retained by Sky, which paid £760 million-a-year. The total domestic rights raised £3.018 billion, an increase of 70.2% over the 2010–11 to 2012–13 rights. The value of the licensing deal rose by another 70.2% in 2015, when Sky and BT paid £5.136 billion to renew their contracts with the Premier League for another three years up to the 2018–19 season.

A new rights cycle began in the 2019–20 season, with the domestic package increasing to 200 matches overall; in February 2018, BT were awarded the package of 32 lunchtime fixtures on Saturdays, while Sky was awarded four of the seven packages, covering the majority of weekend fixtures (including eight new prime time fixtures on Saturdays), as well as Monday and Friday matches. Two remaining packages of 20 fixtures each were to be sold at a later date, including three rounds of mid-week fixtures and a bank holiday round. As Sky already owned the maximum number of matches it could hold without breaching a 148-match cap, it was speculated that at least one of the new packages could go to a new entrant, such as a streaming service. The five packages sold to BT and Sky were valued at £4.464 billion. In June 2018, it was announced that Amazon Prime Video and BT had acquired the remaining two packages; Amazon acquired rights to 20 matches per-season, covering a mid-week round in December, and all Boxing Day fixtures. The Amazon telecasts are produced in association with Sunset + Vine and BT Sport.

With the resumption of play in the 2019–20 Premier League due to the COVID-19 pandemic in the United Kingdom, the Premier League announced that all remaining matches would be carried on British television, split primarily across Sky, BT, and Amazon. A large number of these matches were also scheduled for free-to-air broadcasts, with Sky airing 25 on Pick, Amazon streaming its four matches on Twitch, and the BBC – for the first time in league history – carrying four live matches.

As matches would continue to be played without spectators upon the start of the 2020–21 Premier League, its clubs voted on 8 September to continue broadcasting all matches through at least September (with the BBC and Amazon each holding one additional match), and "appropriate arrangements" being made for October. It was later announced that matches not selected for broadcast would be carried on pay-per-view via BT Sport Box Office and Sky Box Office at a cost of £14.95 per-match. The PPV scheme was poorly received; the Football Supporters' Federation felt that the price was too high, and there were concerns that it could encourage piracy. There were calls from supporters to boycott the pay-per-views, and make donations to support charitable causes instead (with Newcastle's "Charity Not PPV" campaign raising £20,000 for a local food bank, and Arsenal fans raising £34,000 for Islington Giving). On 13 November, amid the reintroduction of measures across the UK, the Premier League officially announced that the non-televised matches would be assigned to its main broadcast partners, and again including additional matches for the BBC and Amazon Prime.

UK highlights

In August 2016, it was announced the BBC would be creating a new magazine-style show for the Premier League entitled The Premier League Show.

Worldwide
The Premier League is the most-watched football league in the world, broadcast in 212 territories to 643 million homes and a potential TV audience of 4.7 billion people,. The Premier League's production arm, Premier League Productions, is operated by IMG Productions and produces content for its international television partners.

The Premier League is the most widely distributed sports programme in Asia. In Australia, Optus telecommunications holds exclusive rights to the Premier League, providing live broadcasts and online access (Fox Sports formerly held rights). In India, the matches are broadcast live on STAR Sports. In China, the broadcast rights were awarded to Super Sports in a six-year agreement that began in the 2013–14 season. As of the 2022–23 season, Canadian media rights to the Premier League are owned by FuboTV, after having been jointly owned by Sportsnet and TSN, and most recently DAZN.

The Premier League is broadcast in the United States by NBC Sports, a division of Sky parent Comcast. Acquiring the rights to the Premier League in 2013 (replacing Fox Soccer and ESPN), NBC Sports has been widely praised for its coverage. NBC Sports reached a six-year extension with the Premier League in 2015 to broadcast the league until the end of the 2021–22 season in a deal valued at $1 billion (£640 million). In November 2021, NBC reached another six-year extension through 2028 in a deal valued at $2.76 billion (£2 billion).

The Premier League is broadcast by SuperSport across sub-Saharan Africa. Broadcasters to continental Europe until 2025 include Canal+ for France, Sky Sport for Germany and Austria, Match TV for Russia, Sky Sport for Italy, Eleven Sports for Portugal, DAZN for Spain, beIN Sports to Turkey, Digi Sport for Romania and NENT to Nordic countries (Sweden, Denmark and Norway), Poland and the Netherlands. In South America, ESPN covers much of the continent, with coverage in Brazil shared between ESPN Brasil and Fox Sports. Sky México broadcasts the league in Central America.

Stadiums

As of the 2017–18 season, Premier League football has been played in 58 stadiums since the formation of the division. The Hillsborough disaster in 1989 and the subsequent Taylor Report saw a recommendation that standing terraces should be abolished. As a result, all stadiums in the Premier League are all-seater. Since the formation of the Premier League, football grounds in England have seen constant improvements to capacity and facilities, with some clubs moving to new-build stadiums. Nine stadiums that have seen Premier League football have now been demolished. The stadiums for the 2017–18 season show a large disparity in capacity. For example, Wembley Stadium, the temporary home of Tottenham Hotspur, has a capacity of 90,000 while Dean Court, the home of AFC Bournemouth, has a capacity of 11,360. The combined total capacity of the Premier League in the 2017–18 season is 806,033 with an average capacity of 40,302.

Stadium attendances are a significant source of regular income for Premier League clubs. For the 2016–17 season, average attendances across the league clubs were 35,838 for Premier League matches with an aggregate attendance of 13,618,596. This represents an increase of 14,712 from the average attendance of 21,126 recorded in the Premier League's first season (1992–93). However, during the 1992–93 season, the capacities of most stadiums were reduced as clubs replaced terraces with seats in order to meet the Taylor Report's 1994–95 deadline for all-seater stadiums. The Premier League's record average attendance of 36,144 was set during the 2007–08 season. This record was then beaten in the 2013–14 season recording an average attendance of 36,695 with an attendance of just under 14 million, the highest average in England's top flight since 1950.

Managers

Managers in the Premier League are involved in the day-to-day running of the team, including the training, team selection and player acquisition. Their influence varies from club-to-club and is related to the ownership of the club and the relationship of the manager with fans. Managers are required to have a UEFA Pro Licence which is the final coaching qualification available, and follows the completion of the UEFA 'B' and 'A' Licences. The UEFA Pro Licence is required by every person who wishes to manage a club in the Premier League on a permanent basis (i.e., more than 12 weeks, the amount of time an unqualified caretaker manager is allowed to take control). Caretaker appointments are managers that fill the gap between a managerial departure and a new appointment. Several caretaker managers have gone on to secure a permanent managerial post after performing well as a caretaker, including Paul Hart at Portsmouth, David Pleat at Tottenham Hotspur and Ole Gunnar Solskjær at Manchester United.

Arsène Wenger is the longest-serving manager, having been in charge of Arsenal in the Premier League from 1996 to his departure at the conclusion of the 2017–18 season, and holds the record for most matches managed in the Premier League with 828, all with Arsenal. He broke the record set by Alex Ferguson, who had managed 810 matches with Manchester United from the Premier League's inception to his retirement at the end of the 2012–13 season. Ferguson was in charge of Manchester United from November 1986 until his retirement at the end of the 2012–13 season, meaning he was manager for the last five years of the old Football League First Division and all of the first 21 seasons of the Premier League.

Notably, since its creation the Premier League has never been won by an English manager.

There have been several studies into the reasoning behind, and effects of, managerial sackings. Most famously, Professor Sue Bridgewater of the University of Liverpool and Dr. Bas ter Weel of the University of Amsterdam, performed two separate studies which helped to explain the statistics behind managerial sackings. Bridgewater's study found clubs generally sack their managers upon dropping below an average of one point per match.

Players

Appearances

Transfer regulations and foreign players

Player transfers may only take place within transfer windows set by the Football Association. The two transfer windows run from the last day of the season to 31 August and from 31 December to 31 January. Player registrations cannot be exchanged outside these windows except under specific licence from the FA, usually on an emergency basis. As of the 2010–11 season, the Premier League introduced new rules mandating that each club must register a maximum 25-man squad of players aged over 21, with the squad list only allowed to be changed in transfer windows or in exceptional circumstances. This was to enable the "home grown" rule to be enacted, whereby the Premier League would also from 2010 require at least eight members of the named 25-man squad to be "home-grown players".

At the inception of the Premier League in 1992–93, just 11 players named in the starting line-ups for the first round of matches hailed from outside of the United Kingdom or Ireland. By 2000–01, the number of foreign players participating in the Premier League was 36% of the total. In the 2004–05 season, the figure had increased to 45%. On 26 December 1999, Chelsea became the first Premier League side to field an entirely foreign starting line-up, and on 14 February 2005, Arsenal were the first to name a completely foreign 16-man squad for a match. By 2009, under 40% of the players in the Premier League were English. By February 2020, 117 different nationalities had played in the Premier League, and 101 nationalities had scored in the competition.

In 1999, in response to concerns that clubs were increasingly passing over young English players in favour of foreign players, the Home Office tightened its rules for granting work permits to players from countries outside of the European Union. A non-EU player applying for the permit must have played for his country in at least 75 per cent of its competitive 'A' team matches for which he was available for selection during the previous two years, and his country must have averaged at least 70th place in the official FIFA world rankings over the previous two years. If a player does not meet those criteria, the club wishing to sign him may appeal.

Following the implementation of Brexit in January 2021, new regulations were introduced which require all foreign players to obtain a Governing Body Endorsement (GBE) in order to play football in the United Kingdom, regardless of EU status.

Top scorers

The Premier League Golden Boot is awarded each season to the top scorer in the division. Former Blackburn Rovers and Newcastle United striker Alan Shearer holds the record for most Premier League goals with 260. Thirty-three players have reached the 100-goal mark. Since the first Premier League season in 1992–93, 23 players from 11 clubs have won or shared the top scorer title. Thierry Henry won his fourth overall scoring title by scoring 27 goals in the 2005–06 season. Andrew Cole and Alan Shearer hold the record for most goals in a season (34) – for Newcastle and Blackburn respectively. Ryan Giggs of Manchester United holds the record for scoring goals in consecutive seasons, having scored in the first 21 seasons of the league. Giggs also holds the record for the most Premier League assists, with 162.

Wages
There is no team or individual salary cap in the Premier League. As a result of the increasingly lucrative television deals, player wages rose sharply following the formation of the Premier League, when the average player wage was £75,000 per year. In the 2018–19 season the average annual salary stood at £2.99 million.

The total salary bill for the 20 Premier League clubs in the 2018–19 season was £1.62 billion; this compares to £1.05 billion in La Liga, £0.83 billion in Serie A, £0.72 billion in Bundesliga, and £0.54 billion in Ligue 1. The club with the highest average wage is Manchester United at £6.5 million. This is smaller than the club with the highest wage bill in Spain (Barcelona £10.5 million) and Italy (Juventus £6.7 million), but higher than in Germany (Bayern Munich £6.4 million) and France (Paris Saint-Germain £6.1 million). For the 2018–19 season, the ratio of the wages of the highest-paid team to lowest-paid in the Premier League is 6.82 to 1. This is much lower than in La Liga (19.1 to 1), Serie A (16 to 1), Bundesliga (20.5 to 1), and Ligue 1 (26.6 to 1). Because of the lower differential between team wage bills in the Premier League, it is often regarded as being more competitive than other top European leagues.

Player transfer fees

The record transfer fee for a Premier League player has risen steadily over the lifetime of the competition. Before the start of the first Premier League season, Alan Shearer became the first British player to command a transfer fee of more than £3 million. The record has increased steadily and Enzo Fernández is now the most expensive transfer involving a Premier League club at £107 million, as well as being the highest transfer fee paid by a Premier League club.

Awards

Trophy

The Premier League maintains two trophies – the genuine trophy (held by the reigning champions) and a spare replica. Two trophies are held for the purpose of making the award within minutes of the title being secured, in the event that on the final day of the season two clubs are still within reach of winning the League. In the rare event that more than two clubs are vying for the title on the final day of the season, a replica won by a previous club is used.

The current Premier League trophy was created by Royal Jewellers Garrard & Co/Asprey of London and was designed in house at Garrard & Co by Trevor Brown and Paul Marsden. It consists of a trophy with a golden crown and a malachite plinth base. The plinth weighs  and the trophy weighs .

Its main body is solid sterling silver and silver gilt, while its plinth is made of malachite, a semi-precious stone. The plinth has a silver band around its circumference, upon which the names of the title-winning clubs are listed. The green of the malachite represents the green field of play. The design of the trophy is based on the heraldry of Three Lions that is associated with English football. Two of the lions are found above the handles on either side of the trophy – the third is symbolised by the captain of the title-winning team as he raises the trophy, and its gold crown, above his head at the end of the season. The ribbons that drape the handles are presented in the team colours of the league champions that year. In 2004, a special gold version of the trophy was commissioned to commemorate Arsenal winning the title without a single defeat.

Player and manager awards
In addition to the winner's trophy and the individual winner's medals awarded to players who win the title, the Premier League also issues other awards throughout the season.

A man-of-the-match award is awarded to the player who has the greatest impact in an individual match.

Monthly awards are also given for the Manager of the Month, Player of the Month and Goal of the Month. These are also issued annually for Manager of the Season, Player of the Season. and Goal of the Season. The Young Player of the Season award is given to the most outstanding U-23 player starting from the 2019–20 season.

The Golden Boot award is given to the top goalscorer of every season, the Playmaker of the Season award is given to the player who makes the most assists of every season, and the Golden Glove award is given to the goalkeeper with the most clean sheets at the end of the season.

From the 2017–18 season, players receive a milestone award for 100 appearances and every century there after and also players who score 50 goals and multiples thereof. Each player to reach these milestones is to receive a presentation box from the Premier League containing a special medallion and a plaque commemorating their achievement.

20 Seasons Awards

In 2012, the Premier League celebrated its second decade by holding the 20 Seasons Awards:

 Fantasy Team of the 20 Seasons
 Panel Choice: Peter Schmeichel, Gary Neville, Tony Adams, Rio Ferdinand, Ashley Cole, Cristiano Ronaldo, Roy Keane, Paul Scholes, Ryan Giggs, Thierry Henry, Alan Shearer
 Public Vote: Peter Schmeichel, Gary Neville, Tony Adams, Nemanja Vidić, Ashley Cole, Cristiano Ronaldo, Steven Gerrard, Paul Scholes, Ryan Giggs, Thierry Henry, Alan Shearer

 Best Manager: Sir Alex Ferguson
 Best Player: Ryan Giggs
 Most Appearances: Gareth Barry (652)
 Top Goalscorer: Alan Shearer (260)
 Most Clean Sheets: David James (173)
 500 Club: Steven Gerrard, Jamie Carragher, Gareth Barry, Ryan Giggs, David James, Gary Speed, Frank Lampard, Emile Heskey and Sol Campbell
 Best Goal: Wayne Rooney, 12 February 2011, Manchester United vs Manchester City
 Best Save: Craig Gordon, 18 December 2010, Sunderland vs Bolton Wanderers
 Best Team: Arsenal 2003–04

See also

 List of English football champions
 List of English Football League managers
 FA Women's Super League (highest league of women's football in England)
 Football records and statistics in England
 List of professional sports teams in the United Kingdom

References

Bibliography

External links

  

 
1
1992 establishments in England
Professional sports leagues in the United Kingdom
Sports leagues established in 1992
England
Organisations based in London